The Type UB III submarine was a class of U-boat built during World War I by the German Imperial Navy.

Between 1916 and 1918, 96 were built.

The UB III type was a coastal submarine, and being a submersible torpedo boat was less akin to UB II type "attack" (i.e. torpedo-launching) boats that preceded it than the highly successful UC II type minelaying submarine. The UC IIs had gained their reputation by sinking more than 1,800 Allied and neutral vessels. German engineers did not miss the chance of expanding the potential of this capable design by incorporating some of its features into a new submersible torpedo boat.

The UB IIIs joined the conflict mid-1917, after the United States declared war on Germany and the United States Navy was added to the ranks of their enemies. When the convoy system was introduced, it became more difficult to engage enemy merchant shipping without being spotted by destroyer escorts.

More than 200 UB III boats were ordered. Of these, 96 were completed, and 89 commissioned into the German Imperial Navy. Thirty-seven boats were lost, four in accidents. Surviving boats had to be surrendered to the Allies in accordance with the requirements of the Armistice with Germany, some of these boats served until 1935.

Germany was prohibited from acquiring a new submarine force by the Treaty of Versailles, but German admirals had no intention of allowing their nation to forget how to construct submarines. Germany started to manufacture and to export slightly modified versions of UB IIs and UB IIIs. Having kept the skills of their engineers polished by this means, they eventually ordered the construction of a new coastal submarine. The resulting design was an improved UB-III that had the benefit of new, all-welded construction techniques and an array of electronic and electromechanical gadgets: the Type VII submarine, the most common U-boat of the Kriegsmarine, was born.

List of Type UB III submarines 
There were 96 Type UB III submarines commissioned into the German Imperial Navy.

References

Bibliography
Conway's All the World's Fighting Ships 1906–1921
 

Type UB III
 
Type UB III